The Cono-Sur Congregation (Congregatio Cono-Sur) is a congregation of monasteries within the Benedictine Confederation. Founded in 1976, the Congregation now includes ten male monasteries spread throughout four of the countries of South America's Southern Cone region. Additionally, eight female monasteries are members of the Congregation. The current Abbot President of the Congregation resides at Monasterio Benedictino Santa María in Los Toldos, Argentina.

List of member houses and dependencies

Male

Argentina
Abadía del Niño Dios (1899), Entre Ríos
Monasterio de la Pascua, Canelones, Uruguay
Monasterio San Benito de Llíu Llíu, Limache, Chile
Abadía de Cristo Rey, El Siambón, Tucumán
Abadía Santa María de Los Toldos, Los Toldos
Monasterio Benedictino, Tupäsy María, Santiago, Paraguay
Abadía de San Benito, Luján
Padres Benedictinos, Buenos Aires
Monasterio de Ntra. Sra. de la Paz, San Agustín, Córdoba
Chile
Abadía de la Ssma. Trinidad de Las Condes, Santiago

Female

Argentina
Monasterio Nuestra Señora del Paraná (1987), Aldea María Luisa, Entre Ríos
Abadía Nuestra Señora de la Esperanza, Rafaela, Santa Fe
Abadía Gaudium Mariae (1979), San Antonio de Arredondo, Córdoba
Monasterio Nuestra Señora de la Fidelidad, San Luis
Abadía de Santa Escolástica (1941), Victoria, Buenos Aires
Chile
Priorato Santa María de Rautén, Quillota
Monasterio de la Asunción de Santa María Virgen, Rengo
Uruguay
Monasterio S. María Madre de la Iglesia, Montevideo

See also
Order of Saint Benedict
Benedictine Confederation

References

Benedictine congregations